G-P (or Guam-Philippines Fiber Optic Submarine Cable System) is a submarine telecommunications cable system in the North Pacific Ocean linking the two named territories.

It has landing points in:
Batangas Bay, Batangas City, Batangas Province, the Philippines
Tanguisson Point, Tumon Village, Guam

It started operation on 31 March 1999.

Sources

References

Submarine communications cables in the Pacific Ocean
Philippines–United States relations
1999 establishments in Guam
1999 establishments in the Philippines